Blood of Ghastly Horror is a 1971 horror film directed by Al Adamson and starring John Carradine, Tommy Kirk, Kent Taylor, and Regina Carrol.

Plot
Dr. Howard Vanard (John Carradine) implants a strange electronic component into the brain of returning Vietnam War veteran Joe Corey (Roy Morton) who becomes a psychotic killer. Corey takes part in a jewel heist with a few cohorts, and while escaping from the scene, the stolen loot is hastily thrown from a rooftop into the back of a pickup truck belonging to a guy named David Clarke. After he violently murders a cocktail waitress in a motel room and a secretary who is working late in an office, Corey goes in search of Dr. Vanard, seeking revenge for what the old arthritic scientist has done to him. In a mindless rage, Corey straps Dr. Vanard to his own lab equipment and electrocutes the mad doctor. Corey and his friends then go to David Clarke's home and beat him up, trying to get him to tell them what happened to the stolen gems that were tossed into Dave's pickup truck, but they finally realize he knows nothing. Corey then follows David Clarke's wife Linda and his young daughter Nancy as they leave town on a trip. The young ladies unknowingly have the stolen jewels with them in their car, concealed in her daughter's doll. Corey chases the two through a snow-covered forest before being shot by a pursuing policeman. He falls off a cliff, clutching the doll and the jewels as he dies.

Some years later, Susan Vanard (Regina Carrol), the mad scientist's daughter, tells the police she's been getting psychic messages from someone in her sleep, speaking about Haiti and voodoo. A weird doctor named Elton Corey (Kent Taylor) has returned from Haiti, bringing with him a murderous zombie named Akro, and has set out to avenge the death of his psychotic son Joe Corey on anyone who was in any way involved with the late Dr. Vanard. Akro the zombie (who for some reason has only one eye) strangles a number of people in alleys as the film proceeds, although his manner of choosing his victims seems to be totally random. Sgt. Cross (Tommy Kirk) however has been investigating the recent spate of murders and feels they are related to the now-closed Joe Corey case, and he questions Susan Vanard about her late father and his connection to what happened to Joe Corey.

A police officer, Sgt. Grimaldi, is killed and mutilated in an alley by Akro the zombie, and his severed head is mailed in a box to a horrified Sgt. Cross. Susan Vanard is kidnapped by the zombie and taken to Dr. Corey's lab, where he injects her with a serum that ages people prematurely and turns them into zombies. As Susan is rapidly transformed into a shriveled mummy, Sgt. Cross finds Dr. Corey's lab just in time. Akro the zombie turns on Dr. Corey when he overhears him say that Akro's body is wearing out and that he'll be dead soon. He strangles Dr. Corey in a rage, and then dies when he can no longer obtain his life-preserving elixir. In the final scene, Susan is able to drink an antidote that returns her to her normal state.

Cast
 Roy Morton as Joe Corey
 Kirk Duncan as David Clarke 
 Tacey Robbins as Linda Clarke
 K.K Riddle as Nancy Clarke
 John Carradine as Dr. Howard Vanard

plus cast members added for this version only:
 Kent Taylor as Dr. Elton Corey
 Regina Carrol as Susan Vanard
 Tommy Kirk as Sergeant Cross
 Richard Smedley as Akro The Zombie
 Arne Warde as Sergeant Grimaldi
 Tanya Maree as Vicky
 Barney Gelfan (Regina Carrol's real-life father) as Police Detective

Production
Blood of Ghastly Horror was re-edited from an earlier film directed by Al Adamson in 1965 titled Psycho A-Go-Go. That film was a straight action thriller about a mentally disturbed man named Joe Corey who pulls off a diamond heist and the stolen jewels wind up hidden in a child's doll, which Corey must track down.

In 1969, Psycho A-Go-Go was totally re-edited, with additional footage featuring actor John Carradine as a mad scientist added, and the film was re-released by American General as The Fiend with the Electronic Brain. In that version, the Joe Corey character is a Vietnam War veteran who is mentally ill because a mad scientist named Dr. Vanard (John Carradine) experimented on his brain. In the end, Corey winds up strapping Dr. Vanard to his own equipment and electrocuting the mad scientist.

Still not satisfied, in 1971 Adamson added more new footage featuring actors Kent Taylor, Tommy Kirk and Regina Carrol, and re-edited the whole thing into an entirely different (horror) film titled Blood of Ghastly Horror. This version was very successfully distributed by Adamson's company Independent-International. In this film, Kent Taylor plays Joe Corey's father who, upon returning from a trip to Haiti, learns that his son's mind and life was destroyed by Dr. Vanard, and decides to seek revenge on anyone in any way associated with his son's death. With the help of a Haitian zombie named Akro, he kidnaps Vanard's daughter (Regina Carrol) and seeks to take out his revenge on her.

As if the film hadn't gone through enough title changes over the years, Sam Sherman later released it to U.S. late-night television as The Man With the Synthetic Brain (with a violent nightclub singer's murder excised). Most of the elaborate musical nightclub numbers that appeared in Psycho A-Go-Go were also cut from Ghastly Horror since actress Tacey Robbins had retired from acting by 1971 and Adamson no longer had a need to promote her singing abilities. Actor Lyle Felice, who had played a major role in Psycho A-Go-Go (as the leader of the jewel thieves) is hardly even in Ghastly Horror at all, as the whole jewel heist plotline was drastically shortened. Tom Poston, a friend of Sam Sherman's who co-wrote the added material with him for Ghastly Horror, committed suicide several years later by purposely crashing the small plane he was flying in at the time.

Sam Sherman was at times asked if the title wasn't a bit overblown, to which he replied "It had blood.....it had horror....and it was certainly ghastly!" He said the film in its third incarnation was incredibly successful, and "played the drive-in circuit and late-night television for many, many years."

Mickey Mouse Club graduate Tommy Kirk appeared in the film for $1,000 for two days filming. He said he regards it as a low point of his career.

References

External links
 

1971 films
Troma Entertainment films
Films directed by Al Adamson
1971 horror films
Mad scientist films
1970s English-language films